The General Association of Korean Residents in Japan, abbreviated as  or , is one of two main organisations for Zainichi Koreans (Korean citizens or residents of Japan), the other being Mindan. It has close ties to North Korea and functions as North Korea's de facto embassy in Japan, as there are no diplomatic relations between the two countries. The organisation is headquartered in Chiyoda, Tokyo, and there are prefectural and regional head offices and branches throughout Japan.

Mindan, officially the Korean Residents Union in Japan, contrastingly consists of Zainichi Koreans who have adopted South Korean nationality. Currently, among 610,000 Korean residents in Japan who have not adopted Japanese nationality, 25 percent are members of the Chongryon, and 65 percent are members of Mindan. Chongryon's strong links to North Korea, its allegiance to the North Korean ideology and its opposition to integration of Koreans into Japanese society have made it the more controversial of the two organisations in Japan.

There are numerous organisations affiliated with the Chongryon, including 18 mass propaganda bodies and 23 business enterprises, with one of its most important business sectors being pachinko. The organisation also operates about 60 Korean schools and a Korean university, as well as banks and other facilities in Japan.

In recent years, the organization has run into severe financial trouble, with debts of over US$750 million, and was ordered by court in 2012 to dispose of most of its assets, including its Tokyo headquarters.

According to an interview with Mitsuhiro Suganuma, former head of the Public Security Intelligence Agency's Second Intelligence Department, Chongryon is under the control of the United Front Department of the Workers' Party of Korea's Liaison Department.

Background and history

Long-term ethnic Korean residents in Japan primarily consist of those, and descendants of, ethnic Koreans who settled in Japan as:
 Migrants during Japan's rule over Korea (1910–1945)
 Conscripted labourers during the Second World War
 Post-World War II refugees, especially from Jeju island escaping the 1948 Jeju massacre.
A 1953 government survey revealed that 93% were from the southern half of the Korean peninsula.

From 1910 to 1945, ethnic Koreans were Japanese nationals. The end of the Second World War left the nationality status of Koreans in an ambiguous position, as no recognized functional government existed on the Korean Peninsula (the Provisional Government of the Republic of Korea, a government-in-exile, was only somewhat recognized internationally and was not a formal Korean government until South Korea's formation in 1948). Their nationality was provisionally registered under the name of Joseon (Chōsen in Japanese), the old name of undivided Korea.

The 1948 declaration of independence by both South and North Korea made Joseon a defunct nation. Those with Joseon nationality were allowed to re-register their nationality to a South Korean one; however the same did not apply to North Korea due to the fact that Japan only recognises South Korea as the legitimate government of Korea, so supporters of the North retained their Joseon nationality.

Ethnic Koreans in Japan established the Association of Koreans in Japan in 1945, which followed a socialist ideology, and was banned in 1949 by the order of Allied occupation army. The United Democratic Front of Korea in Japan was established in 1951, which was banned due to suspected involvement in the 1952 May Day riots.

In 1952, the North Korean leader Kim Il-sung called on the socialist Zainichi Korean movement to be coordinated in close contact with the North Korean government, and to fight, not for a socialist revolution in Japan, but for the socialist reunification of the Korean peninsula.

Chongryon was established on 25 May 1955 by Han Duk-su, who was an activist for leftist labor movements in Japan.

In the late 1950s, Chongryon conducted a campaign to persuade Zainichi Koreans to migrate to North Korea. The campaign was vehemently opposed by Mindan which organised hunger strikes and train obstructions. Some 87,000 Zainichi Koreans and about 6000 Japanese spouses moved to the North. According to a defector, himself a former returnee, many petitioned to be returned to Japan and in response were sent to political prison camps. Japanese research puts the number of Zainichi Korean returnees condemned to prison camps at around 10,000.
In 1990 Ha Su-to, former vice chief of organization for Chongryon who was expelled in 1972 for demanding democratic reforms, led a rally in Tokyo of 500 to protest against North Korea's human rights violations, in which protesters accused North Korea of holding the ex-Zainichi returnees captive to siphon money off remittances from their relatives in Japan.

On 25 November 2020, Pak Ku-ho was replacing Ho Jong-man as the head of Chongryon due to the latter's health complications from diabetes.

Conflict with South Korea
The South Korean National Election Commission considered preventing Chongryon residents from voting in the 2012 South Korean Presidential Election.

2011 Tōhoku earthquake and tsunami
The North Korean Chongryon-affiliated Fukushima Korean School sheltered 18 Japanese citizens from 18 March until the end of March. However, the Chongryon criticized the Ministry of Foreign Affairs of Japan for not officially recognizing North Korea as one of the countries that sent humanitarian aid to the survivors of the 2011 Tōhoku earthquake and tsunami.

Death and funeral of Kim Jong-il
Following the death of North Korean leader Kim Jong-il in December 2011, Chongryon ordered members to keep a low profile. Pupils at its schools were barred from speaking to reporters, Japanese and Westerners alike, who in turn were turned away from facilities.

The Japanese government nevertheless refused to issue re-entry permits to stop Chongryon personnel in case they wanted to attend the funeral.

Auction
In June 2012, the Japanese Supreme Court recognized Chongryon's role as North Korea's de facto embassy and authorized the seizure of Chongryon properties to pay off debts incurred. In 2013 a bid was approved on the property by Ekan Ikeguchi who was subsequently unable to secure funding. In November 2014, Marunaka Holdings Co. purchased the property for ¥2.21 billion with plans to evict the Chongryon.

Incidents
On 23 February 2018, the Chongryon building was targeted in an attack when two persons in a van opened fire at the compound before 4 in the morning. They were eventually arrested by police and were identified as Satoshi Katsurada, a right-wing activist and Yoshinori Kawamura, an ex-yakuza member with the latter confirmed as the person responsible for firing a gun with five shots fired.

On 9 July 2020, an anti-riot officer stationed near Chongryon killed himself after he was off duty with his own sidearm.

Surveillance
On 17 May 2019, it was announced that Japanese law enforcement will continue to monitor Chongryon activities due to its close ties with North Korea.

Relationship with international corporations
According to the Dong-A Ilbo, the Chongryon cooperated with Nike to make an advertisement addressing problems of Zainichi Koreans in 2020.

Ideology
On their website, Chongryon claims that all their activities are based around the concept of Juche, the official state ideology of North Korea.

Chongryon says it is committed to a peaceful reunification of the Korean peninsula under North Korean Juche, and it does not recognise the Republic of Korea (South Korea). It refers to South Korea as Minami Chosen (Namjosŏn, "Southern Joseon"), as opposed to the usual term used in Japanese to refer to it: Kankoku (Hanguk). (See Names of Korea.)

Chongryon opposes the use of the Japanese word Kita-Chosen ("North Korea") as an abbreviation of the Democratic People's Republic of Korea. It refers to the country as Kyōwakoku ("The Republic") or Sokoku ("The Fatherland"). In 1972 Chongryon campaigned to get the Japanese media to stop referring to North Korea as Kita-Chosen. This effort was not successful, but as a compromise, most media companies agreed to refer to the DPRK with its full official title at least once in every article. By January 2003, this policy started to be abandoned by most newspapers, starting with Tokyo Shimbun, which announced that it would no longer write out the full name, followed by Asahi, Mainichi and Nikkei.

Chongryon claims to be a representative body of overseas North Korean citizens living in Japan and rejects the notion that they are a mere ethnic minority.

Out of the two main Korean organisations in Japan, Chongryon has been the more militant in advocating retention of Korean ethnic identity. It is generally opposed to Korean-Japanese integration into Japanese society; for example, it discourages its members from naturalising as Japanese citizens or marrying Japanese (which it calls an "international marriage"). It even rejects Zainichi Koreans' right to vote or participate in Japanese regional elections, which it sees as an unacceptable attempt at assimilation into Japanese society. This is in contrast to Mindan, which is campaigning for wider Zainichi Korean participation in Japanese politics.

Activities
Chongryon runs support and advisory services for members, such as legal and marriage advice and employment help. It is responsible for issuing North Korean passports.

Chongryon-affiliated organisations operate businesses and banks to provide jobs, services and social networks for Zainichi Koreans outside of mainstream society. In the 1970s and 1980s, these organizations constituted an important economic link between North Korea and Japan. The Chongryon-affiliated companies monitored the Tokyo Stock Exchange to enable the DPRK to sell its non-ferrous metals and other mineral products at the most advantageous prices, and purchased inexpensive Japanese consumer goods for re-export to the Comecon countries. Chongryon supporters are thought to control as much as one third of the pachinko industry in Japan. An important function of these enterprises is earning hard currency to be remitted to Pyongyang. These remittances have been estimated at between $600 million and $1.9 billion each year but are probably much lower. Chongryon announced plans on 17 March 2010 to open three restaurants in Pyongyang; each restaurant will be managed by the main headquarter in Tokyo, the Kantō regional chapter, and the Kinki-Tōkai regional chapter.

Chongryon publishes the Choson Sinbo newspaper as well as magazines and other publications. Websites run by Chongryon-affiliated organisations include the English-language People's Korea. Chongryon also runs cultural activities and sports teams representing its members.

Chongryon organises trips by members to North Korea, usually to visit relatives, as well as educational visits for students of Korean schools. They operated Man Gyong Bong 92, a passenger and cargo ferry which linked Niigata in Japan to Wonsan in North Korea, which served as the only direct link between the two countries, and is a subject of much controversy. The ferry was barred from entering the Japanese port for six months in response to North Korea's July 2006 missile tests and was banned indefinitely following the 2006 North Korean nuclear test.

The Congress, the highest legislative organ of Chongryon, has met every three years since 1961 to discuss its agenda, the election of key leaders and its budget.

Interaction with DePauw University

In January 2019, Korea University—Chongryon's only higher educational institution—hosted its first exchange program with US students from DePauw University. The program was organized by DePauw University Professor Derek Ford, West Chester University of Pennsylvania Professor Curry Malott and Kiyul Chung, a Professor at Korea University, the only person born in the southern half of the peninsula to teach at Kim Il-Sung University in the DPRK, and founder of the 21st Century International Relations Institute. A total of 14 US students and two US professors went on the trip, where they spent time with Korea University students and professors, as well as primary, middle, and high school students from other Chongryon affiliated schools. Additionally, they met with Chongryon chapters and toured important cultural sites of Koreans in Japan, including the infamous tunnels the Japanese forced Koreans to dig during World War II.

The DePauw students were "the first-ever group of US students to visit the schools and institutions of Chongryon, the General Association of Korean Residents in Japan."

The trip was wildly successful. Choson Sinbo ran several articles, including one that predicted the warming and normalization between the US and DPRK that was framed around the US-Koreans in Japan exchange.

Jung Da Min of the Korea Times wrote that the article "was written on the occasion of U.S. university students' visit to the pro-Pyongyang Korea University in the Japanese capital, and highlighted improving relations between the two countries on the government and non-government level." It further noted that "Professor Ford also held an English lecture for students of the two universities on the subject of the history of North Koreans in Japan over the past 70 years following liberation from Japanese occupation."

An article in the World Tribune similarly wrote that "Choson Sinbo's report also noted that a group of U.S. university students visited the (pro-Pyongyang) Korea University in Tokyo... The students’ were led by Professor Derek Ford of DePauw University in Indiana. It was the first student exchange between DePauw University and Korea University through their joint project titled 'Int’l Student Exchange Program: ISEP.' The U.S. delegation was comprised 14 students and two professors. They toured the university’s campus, museum and historic sites from Japanese colonial rule, such as a site of Korean forced labor."

In 2020, Professor Ford delivered a lecture at the Regular Study Group of the Juche Idea based on his previous lecture on the Groundings podcast in 2018 and at Korea University in 2016 and 2019. The meeting focused on Kim Jong-un's recent New Year's Speech. The International Institute of the Juche Idea's journal notes that Ford was introduced by Recter Han, who read "a note written by a student from the US who had visited the said University last year. His honest impressions were written in such a way as that he was resentful when he first learned of the unreasonable policies of the Japanese and US governments on the DPRK, and that he was determined to change his wrong recognition and his previous attitude toward the DPRK." The journal continues to describe Ford's talk as focusing on how, "In the 1950s, the DPRK gave the first blow to the US. Likely, there emerged a tendency of anti-US imperialism on a worldwide scale. However, the collapse of the Soviet Union accelerated the tendency of anti-revolution instead. Under those circumstances, the US came to establish a unilateral supremacy, it has been weakened gradually though. Whereas the Soviet Union collapsed, the DPRK has made a great stride on the basis of the Juche idea. Truly, things Korea should be decided by the Korean people themselves. And it is the WPK that takes full responsibility for the destiny of the Korean people."

The trip was so successful that Korea University welcomed DePauw University back in January 2020. The plans to repeat the trip in January 2021 were postponed because of COVID-19, although the trip will resume as soon as the travel restrictions are lifted.

First Academic Peace Delegation to Chongryon 
In the first official U.S. delegation since the Japanese government lifted travel restrictions, the "First Academic Peace Delegation" visited Chongryon between November 20–26, 2022. Composed of professor Sarah Pfohl and student Riley Seungyoon Park from the University of Indianapolis, professor Curry Malott of  West Chester University of Pennsylvania, and professor Derek Ford and student Maria Esposito of DePauw University, the delegation visited several Chongryon institutions and, additionally, testified at the National Diet and spoke at the protest outside of the Ministry of Education, Culture, Sports, Science and Technology in support of Korean schools in Japan.

Membership
Chongryon members primarily consist of those who have retained their registration as Joseon nationals (Japanese: Chōsen-seki), instead of taking or being born with Japanese or South Korean nationality. Joseon nationality was a legal status that the Japanese government defined in the aftermath of World War II, when the government of the Korean peninsula was in an undetermined state. Prior to the end of World War II, Korea was administered by the Japanese government as being part of Japan, thus the legal nationality of Koreans, both in Japan and in Korea, was Japanese.

Five other senior Chongryon officials are also members of the Supreme People's Assembly (North Korea's parliament).

The PSIA reported that Chongryon had 70,000 members in 2016.

Korean schools

Chongryon operates 140 ethnic Korean schools (Chōsen gakkō  or chosǒn hakkyo ) across Japan, including kindergartens and one university, Korea University, initially partly funded by the North Korean government. All lessons and all conversation in the school are conducted in Korean. They teach a strong pro-North Korean ideology and allegiance to Kim Il-sung, Kim Jong-il and Kim Jong-un. They are not classified as regular schools under Japanese law as they do not follow the national curriculum.

Their militant stance is increasingly coming under criticism from pupils, parents and the public alike. The number of pupils receiving ethnic education from Chongryon-affiliated schools has declined sharply in recent years, down to about 10,000 in 2009 from a high of 46,000 in the early 1970s, with many, if not most, Zainichi now opting to send their children to mainstream Japanese schools. , there were 12 Chosen high schools with an enrollment of about 2,000 students.

The schools were initially funded by North Korea, but this money has dried up. Today funding comes partly from local Japanese authorities, and many schools are facing financial difficulties. The Japanese government has refused Chongryon's requests that it fund Korean schools, citing Article 89 of the Japanese Constitution, according to which use of public funds for education by "schemes not under public control" is prohibited. Chongryon calls this an act of racial discrimination. Funding from local authorities usually takes place in the form of special benefits paid to the families of pupils, as opposed to paying the schools directly, to avoid a blatant breach of Article 89.

Mindan has also traditionally operated a school system for the children of its members, although it has been always less widespread and organized compared to its Chongryon counterpart.

Another issue is the high school equivalency examination, daiken, that qualifies those who have not graduated from a regular high school to apply for a place in a state university and take an entrance exam. Until recently, only those who had completed compulsory education (i.e., up to junior high school) were entitled to take the daiken; this meant pupils of ethnic schools had to do extra courses before being allowed to take the exam. In 1999 the requirement was amended so that anyone over a certain age is qualified. Campaigners were not satisfied because this still meant graduates of non-Japanese high schools had to take the daiken. In 2003, the Education Ministry removed the requirement to take the equivalency test from graduates of Chinese schools, Mindan-run Korean schools and international schools affiliated with Western nations and accredited by American and British organisations. However, this did not apply to graduates of Chongryon schools, saying it could not approve their curricula. The decision was left up to individual universities, 70% of which allowed Chongryon school graduates to apply directly.

The North Korean government sponsored Chongryon schools for 50 years with "funds for educational support" and "scholarships" totaling around 46 billion yen. The Japanese government has proposed covering the tuition for all private high schools in Japan, with the exception of the Chosen schools. As the Chosen high schools are not being covered by the tuition support, there have been conflicts within the Chongryon whether to make amendments to school policies or keep them as is.

The Zaitokukai received criticism from the District Court for harassing Chongryon-affiliated schoolchildren.

Decline in membership

Until the 1970s, Chongryon was the dominant Zainichi group, and in some ways remains more politically significant today in Japan. However, the widening disparity between the political and economic conditions of the two Koreas has since made Mindan, the pro-South Korean group, the larger and less politically controversial faction.

In general, Chongryon is a declining organization primarily maintained by older Zainichi Chosenjin who appreciate the contributions the organization and the North Korean government has made to their lives, regardless of present political conditions. In comparison, third- and fourth-generation Zainichi Chosenjin have largely given up active participation or loyalty to the Chongryon ideology. Reasons stated for this increased disassociation include widespread mainstream tolerance of Koreans by Japanese in recent years, greatly reducing the need to rely on Chongryon, and the increasing unpopularity of Kim Jong-il during his later years even among loyal members of Chongryon. Many Zainichi Chosenjin also felt deeply betrayed by the North Korean government's recent admission that it had kidnapped at least 13 Japanese citizens over the years, because Chongryon had been categorically and fiercely denying for many years that the abductions had ever taken place. Whether the officials of Chongryon knew of the kidnappings or not, ordinary members of Chongryon who had believed the party line felt deeply humiliated and disillusioned upon discovering that they had been used as mouthpieces to deny serious wrongdoing by North Korea.

Controversies over Chongryon
For a long time, Chongryon enjoyed unofficial immunity from searches and investigations, partly out of respect for its role as North Korea's de facto embassy, and partly due to its power as a political pressure group. However, escalating tensions between Japan and North Korea over a number of issues, namely its nuclear weapons programme and its abduction of Japanese nationals has led to a resurgence of public animosity against Chongryon due to its active support of the Pyongyang regime. Acts which Chongryon officials are suspected of include illicit transfer of funds to North Korea, espionage, and smuggling of technology and missile parts.

Since allegations of Pyongyang's nuclear weapons programme first surfaced in the early 1990s, Chongryon has frequently reported being targeted by hate mail, malicious phone calls, and numerous incidents. Chongryon facilities have also frequently been sites of protests by Japanese right-wing groups. There have been numerous incidents of students of Chongryon schools, identifiable by their uniforms based on traditional Korean costumes, suffering verbal abuse. Furthermore, around May and June 1994 there was a series of physical assaults on Chongryon students in which their uniforms were cut; this was reported heavily in the Japanese media and triggered a Ministry of Justice investigation. The investigation determined that the students had cut their own uniforms. In 1998, a petrol bomb was thrown at Chongryon's headquarters in Tokyo, causing minor damage. In June 2003, a shot was fired into a Chongryon warehouse in Niigata, hitting cargo waiting to be loaded onto Mangyongbong-92. In October 2006 in the aftermath of North Korea's first nuclear test, a suspected arson attack damaged a bamboo grove inside Chongryon's school in Mito. A 15-year-old female student was pelted with eggs at the school the same day.

The Japanese authorities have recently started to crack down on Chongryon activities, moves usually criticised by Chongryon as acts of political suppression. The first raid on Chongryon facilities was in 1994, when a rally held in Osaka by Rescue the North Korean People (RENK), a Japanese citizens group set up to help refugees and demand democracy and human rights in North Korea, was attacked and broken up by a 100-strong mob. Police investigations revealed that the disruption was orchestrated by Chongryon.

In November 2001, police raided the Tokyo headquarters of Chongryon and its Tokyo regional office as part of an investigation into alleged embezzlement by one of it senior officials. This followed an arrest of Kang Young-kwan, 66, a member of Chongryon's central standing committee and a former head of its financial bureau, among other Chongryon officials, who admitted diverting $6.5 million on behalf of Chongryon from the Tokyo Chogin, a credit union set up to serve pro-North Korean residents which failed in 1999. About 400 Chongryon supporters scuffled with police after they gathered in protest at what they called an act of political suppression and racial discrimination.

In 2002, Shotaro Tochigi, deputy head of the Public Security Intelligence Agency told a session of the House of Representatives Financial Affairs Committee that the agency is investigating Chongryon for suspected illicit transfers of funds to the North. In 2003, a North Korean defector made a statement to the US Senate committee stating that more than 90% of the parts used by North Korea to construct its missiles were brought from Japan aboard Mangyongbong-92, a Chongryon-operated ship which is the only regular direct link between North Korea and Japan. In 2003, The Associated Press reported that Japanese authorities are preparing to charge a 72-year-old former senior member of Chongryon who was engaged in espionage activities for using false identity. It was claimed that espionage instructions were relayed to him by the captain of Man Gyong Bong 92. Prime Minister Junichiro Koizumi told reporters "We must watch (the vessel) closely lest it be used for crime."

In July 2003, the Tokyo Metropolitan Government reversed a decision made in 1972 by the Marxist Governor Ryokichi Minobe to exempt Chongryon from property tax. Chongryon refused to pay, resulting in seizure of three Chongryon properties. In March 2006, following a ruling by Fukuoka High Court, the Internal Affairs Ministry instructed prefectural governments across Japan to review any property tax exemptions on Chongryon properties. Some local authorities resisted the move.

In March 2006, police raided six Chongryon-related facilities in an investigation into the circumstances surrounding the June 1980 disappearance of one of the alleged abductees, Tadaaki Hara. Police spokesman said that the head of Chongryon at the time is suspected of co-operating in his kidnap.

In May 2006, Chongryon and the pro-South Mindan agreed to reconcile, only for the agreement to break down the following month due to Mindan's distrust of Chongryon. North Korea's missile tests in July 2006 have deepened the divide, with Chongryon refusing to condemn the missile tests, expressing only its regret that the Japanese government has suspended the operation of the Man Gyong Bong 92. Outraged senior Mindan officials joined mainstream Japanese politicians and media in sharply criticizing Chongryon's silence over the matter.

In November 2006, police raided the Chongryon's Tokyo headquarters in an investigation behind an attempt to illegally export 60 bags of intravenous solutions to North Korea. The solution was intercepted by Japanese customs as they were taken aboard Man Gyong Bong 92. It was reported that the solutions could have been used to make biological weapons, a claim denied by Chongryon. Crowds of Chongryon supporters tried to block access to the building, leading to deployment of riot police. In February 2007, police in Hokkaido raided ten locations linked to Chongryon, including its Hokkaido head office in Sapporo and a famous mutton yakiniku restaurant owned by a senior Chongryon official in Susukino, Sapporo, over alleged tax evasion amounting to tens of millions of yen. Four people, including the restaurant owner and a senior official of Chongryon's Sapporo chamber of commerce and industry, were arrested. Also in February 2007, Police raided several locations including Chongryon's Hyogo headquarters in Kobe, and arrested three people, including Song Gi-hwan, who heads the accounting division of Chongryon's Hyogo chamber of commerce and industry, over alleged unlicensed accounting. Riot police scuffled with a crowd of Chongryon supporters who gathered in protest. Footage of the raids were later released by Chongryon.

On 3 March 2007, thousands of Chongryon members staged a rally in Hibiya Park in protest against police investigations into the organisation and bullying of schoolchildren, which they called "political suppression and human rights abuses" by the Japanese authorities. The protesters, who numbered between 3000 (according to local media) and 7000 (according to Chongryon), staged a 2.9 km-long march wielding posters of the North Korean leader Kim Jong-il. Chongryon's number two, Nam Sung-u was quoted as saying "Japan's violations of human rights against the DPRK and Koreans in Japan cannot be allowed, no matter what". The Tokyo Metropolitan Government attempted to ban the protest fearing violence but they were overruled by a court ruling. Riot police scuffled with Japanese ultranationalist groups who had gathered in counterprotest resulting in one arrest. In June 2007, it was reported that Chongryon attempted to sell its main headquarters to Shigetake Ogata, (ex-head of the Public Security Intelligence Agency who now leads an investment firm) due to financial troubles and tensions with the Japanese government, however, creditors moved to block the sale in court and, according to North Korea's official news service article of 22 June 2007, the courts granted a Japanese collection agency the right to dispose of the property.

In 2014, Japanese courts blocked a Mongolian company from buying the Chongryon building.

On 28 May 2022, Kim Jong-un sent a 10,000-character letter to the members. In late October, a Japanese memoir Farewell: 77 Years Struggling of Chongryon and Mindan was published, in which the author described his actions against Mindan as a result of being misled by Chongryon, and expressed his apologies to Mindan.

Chongryon Affiliates

 3 Kindergartens
 19 Elementary schools
 34 Combined elementary and junior high schools
 5 Combined elementary, junior high, and high schools
 2 Junior high schools
 3 Combined junior and senior high schools
 4 High schools
 1 University – Korea University
 1 Academy – 
 8 Banks
 1 Insurance company – Kumgang Insurance Company
 12 Art groups
 Chongryon Film Studio
 Korean Literature and Art Studio
 Korean Music Studio
 
 Tokyo Korean Song and Dance Ensemble
 Northern Kanto Song and Dance Ensemble
 Tokai Korean Song and Dance Ensemble
 Kyoto Korean Song and Dance Ensemble
 Osaka Korean Song and Dance Ensemble
 Hyogo Korean Song and Dance Ensemble
 Hiroshima Song and Dance Ensemble
 Kyoshyo Song and Dance Ensemble
 Commercial enterprises
 Chugai Travel
 Korean—Japanese Export-Import Trading Company
 Donghae Commercial Company
 Korean Speciality Treading Company
 Chiyoda International Treading Company
 Kongtong Hungye Company
 Kyonghwa Commercial Company
 Runghung Merchant Company
 Near Ocean Transportation Company
 Haeyang Medicine Company
 
 Zainichi Korean Business and Industry League
 Zainichi Korean Youth Business and Industry Association
 Zainichi Korean Teachers' League
 Korean Central Education Association in Japan
 United Zainichi Korean Credit Association
 
 Zainichi Korean Comment Publisher Association
 Zainichi Korean Social Scientist Association
 Zainichi Korean Health Association
 Zainichi Korean Literature and Art League
 Korean Art Research Institute
 Zainichi Korean Sport League
 
 Korean Overseas Student League in Japan
 Zainichi Korean Student Committee
 Zainichi Korean Religious League
 Zainichi Korean Buddhist Association
 Zainichi Korean Historicism and Archaeology Association
 Korean Democratic Woman Association in Japan
 
 Korean Reunification Comrades' Association in Japan
 Korean Peace Upholding Committee in Japan
 Choson Sinbo Publishing House
 Haku Sopang
 Korean Youth Society
 Korean Issue Research Institute
 Chongryon Unified Enterprise Propulsion Committee
 Compatriots' Marriage Introducing Center

See also

 Ethnic issues in Japan
 General Association of Koreans in China
 Korean diaspora
 Juchesasangpa
 Koreatown
 Mindan
 North Korean abductions of Japanese citizens
 Pyongyang (restaurant chain)

Notes

References

Further reading
 Ford, Derek Chongryon: The struggle of Koreans in Japan. Liberation School, 30 January 2019.

 Ryang, Sonia: The Rise and Fall of Chongryun—From Chōsenjin to Zainichi and beyond. The Asia-Pacific Journal: Japan Focus vol. 14, issue 15, no 11 (1 August 2016).

External links

  
 Charles Scanlon: Identity crisis for Japan's Koreans. BBC, 25 November 2002.
 . Journeyman Pictures, 7 January 2015.

Organizations based in Tokyo
De facto embassies
Japan–North Korea relations
Anti-Japanese sentiment in North Korea
Anti-North Korean sentiment in Japan
Zainichi Korean culture
Identity politics in Japan
Identity politics in Korea
Far-left politics in Japan
Communism in Japan
Juche political parties
1955 establishments in Japan
Organizations established in 1955
Diaspora organizations of political parties